Anton Berger is an Austrian para-alpine skier. He represented Austria at the 1976 Winter Paralympics and at the 1980 Winter Paralympics and, in total, he won two silver medals and two bronze medals at the Winter Paralympics.

His win at the 1980 Slalom 2B event formed part of a medal sweep as Gerhard Langer and Anton Ledermaier, both representing Austria as well, won the gold and bronze medals respectively.

Achievements

See also 

 List of Paralympic medalists in alpine skiing

References

External links 
 

Living people
Year of birth missing (living people)
Place of birth missing (living people)
Paralympic alpine skiers of Austria
Alpine skiers at the 1976 Winter Paralympics
Alpine skiers at the 1980 Winter Paralympics
Medalists at the 1976 Winter Paralympics
Medalists at the 1980 Winter Paralympics
Paralympic bronze medalists for Austria
Paralympic silver medalists for Austria
Paralympic medalists in alpine skiing